The Kendal and Windermere Railway built a branch line from the main line to Kendal and on to Windermere, in Cumbria in north-west England. It was promoted by local interests in Kendal when it became clear that the Lancaster and Carlisle Railway would not be routed through Kendal. It was built from a junction at Oxenholme to Kendal to a terminus near Windermere; at the time there was no settlement of that name. The line opened in April 1847. The engineer was Joseph Locke and the partnership of contractors consisted of Thomas Brassey, William Mackenzie, Robert Stephenson and George Heald.

Excursion traffic and residential development was greatly encouraged by the branch line, and the town of Windermere flourished but the company was not commercially successful and sold its line to the London and North Western Railway. The leisure business on which the branch line depended declined considerably around 1960 and the infrastructure was simplified.  It remains open as the Windermere branch line.

Origin 

In the 1830s the railway network was emerging in England and central Scotland but they were not connected. From 1832 it became increasingly certain that a connection between England and Scotland would be built northward from Preston to Carlisle and beyond. The difficult terrain presented a significant challenge, particularly because steam engines did not have a great hauling power in the early years. A line following the Cumberland coast reached by a massive barrage across Morecambe Bay was proposed, but although it gave access to population centres, it was a very roundabout route and the cost of the Morecambe Bay barrage would be considerable.

More direct routes were proposed involving steep gradients and long tunnels and several were viable. Kendal was the only town of any size between Lancaster and Carlisle and there was great dismay in Kendal when the favoured routes by-passed the town. A possible route running north from Kendal along Long Sleddale required a long and deep tunnel to proceed to the west shore of Hawes Water.

Finance was hard to come by and proponents of the Lancaster and Carlisle Railway, delayed presenting a Bill in Parliament, but in 1843 their engineer, Joseph Locke, made some modifications to the intended route to save expense, and published a route passing several miles east of Kendal. Interested parties in Kendal decided to build a branch railway to their town from the Lancaster and Carlisle Railway and continue it to the shore of Windermere, which was by then a tourist attraction.

In the 1845 session of Parliament, a Bill was presented for the Kendal and Windermere Railway which was to run from Oxenholme to Birthwaite, a small community in what is now Windermere town. It would make a junction with the Lancaster and Carlisle Railway at Oxenholme. The Bill passed without opposition, and Royal Assent was given on 30 June 1845. The line would be single track between Kendal and Windermere, although it was changed to double track, without increasing the authorised £125,000 share capital. Construction was carried out in collaboration with the Lancaster and Carlisle Railway.

Opening 

The line was opened ceremonially on 21 September 1846 at the same time as the L&CR line opened between Lancaster and Kendal Junction. The opening to passenger traffic was on the following day. Until the L&CR line was opened northwards, the line was operated between Lancaster and Kendal. After the opening of the L&CR to Carlisle, some Kendal trains were worked as a shuttle service between Kendal and Oxenholme, a practice perpetuated when the K&WR opened throughout to Windermere, on 20 April 1847. Goods traffic on the Kendal line began on 4 January 1847. The junction station was named Kendal Junction and was an exchange platform not accessible other than to change trains.

Early operation 
At first there were five trains a day in each direction between Kendal and Windermere, with extra trips to Oxenholme; but by the summer of 1853 there were six trains each way between Kendal and Windermere and nine return journeys between Kendal and Oxenholme. A passenger carriage was attached to the 16.00 goods train out of Windermere. On special holidays a cheap day return ticket from Kendal to Windermere cost 6d.

The K&WR company was constantly in financial and operational difficulty and petty disagreements with the L&CR, on which it relied for onward journeys were commonplace. By 1848 the K&WR saw that independence was difficult and made overtures to the L&CR to lease or buy the line, but was not received favourably. For ten years there was constant friction. K&WR trains were often late arriving at Oxenholme and main line trains were held until the L&CR grew impatient and told the K&WR to get its trains to the junction ten minutes earlier.

The branch was worked by the London and North Western Railway as part of the pool of rolling stock it made available to the Lancaster and Carlisle Railway. From summer 1850 the working was transferred to E B Wilson, of Leeds, until the company took on its own working in November 1851.

The K&WR system was leased in perpetuity to the L&CR from 1 May 1858 and Parliamentary ratification took place in the L&CR general powers Act of 13 August 1859 when the L&CR was leased to the LNWR which guaranteed the K&WR shareholders 3 per cent on ordinary shares and 6 per cent on the preference shares. The K&WR company continued as a financial entity until 21 July 1879.

Development 

At first Windermere station stood alone with only the Windermere hotel nearby, but the lake was an attractive destination for visitors and also for residences for the wealthy merchants of Lancashire's industrial towns. The growth of excursion travel and local businesses to support it was phenomenal. On Whit Monday 1883, excursion visitors numbered 8,000 persons. Wealthy merchants were provided with an exclusive club car working in to Windermere on Friday afternoons, but later running each way daily. The vehicle continued in use until 1939.

Kendal station was inadequate and the LNWR reconstructed it in 1861  as "a handsome and substantial structure".

Decline 
Although Kendal was an industrial centre, the line could not sustain its importance without the leisure traffic, and that declined in the 1960s. The route was reduced to a single line without a run-round facility at Windermere in 1973, and Joy remarks that:

This created the bizarre situation of excursions having to terminate at Oxenholme and disgorge their passengers on to droves of road coaches while the trains were worked empty over the 50 miles to Carlisle for turning and servicing.

In 1986 the station site at Windermere was simplified, a supermarket was built on the former goods yard and the station was relocated a short distance from its original position.

Opposition 
Opposition to the line came from people against what they saw as destruction of the Lake District landscape. They included the poet William Wordsworth. His letters to the editor of the Morning Post are reproduced in The Illustrated Wordsworth's Guide to the Lakes, P. Bicknell, Ed. (Congdon and Weed, New York, 1984), pp. 186–198. His reactions to the technological and "picturesque" incursions of man on his beloved, wild landscape most famously include the following sonnet:

On the opening of the railway in 1847 one of the contracting engineers, George Heald, wrote an impassioned riposte to Wordsworth accusing him of wanting to obstruct the opportunities the railway would bring.  It is dated 15 April 1847, the Locomotive at Orrest Head.  He argues for the democratising influence of the railway and the cultural and social benefits it will bring rather than the economic reasons that might be expected from a railway engineer:

See also 

 History of rail transport in Great Britain
 List of early British railway companies

Notes

References 

London and North Western Railway
Rail transport in Cumbria
Early British railway companies
Railway companies established in 1845
Railway lines opened in 1847
Railway companies disestablished in 1858
1845 establishments in England
British companies disestablished in 1858
British companies established in 1845